Tsaritsyno is a railway station of Line D2 of the Moscow Central Diameters in Moscow. It was opened in 1865. The current station was built in 1908 according to the project of the architect V.K. Fillipov.

Leo Tolstoy in his novel "Anna Karenina" describes the celebration of the volunteers traveling to the Russo-Turkish War at the Tsaritsyno station.

References

Railway stations in Moscow
Railway stations of Moscow Railway
Railway stations in the Russian Empire opened in 1865
Line D2 (Moscow Central Diameters) stations
Cultural heritage monuments of regional significance in Moscow